Jan Rembowski (12 January 1879 in Warsaw – 26 January 1923 in Warsaw) was a Polish Symbolist painter, pastelist and sculptor. He was also associated with Art Nouveau.

Biography 
His father was a landlord and had been a participant in the January Uprising. He took his first drawing lessons from Wojciech Gerson, then studied sculpture at the Kraków Academy of Fine Arts with Konstanty Laszczka. In 1905, he married a French woman, who was there teaching the language, and had two daughters; one of whom, became an illustrator.

From 1905 to 1907, he studied painting with Józef Mehoffer. During that time, he helped found the "Group of Five" (or "Group Norwid", after Cyprian Norwid) with Leopold Gottlieb, Wlastimil Hofman,  and Witold Wojtkiewicz. The group promoted the idea of a connection between literature, music and the visual arts. He also helped create a group called "Sztuka Podhalańska" in Zakopane, where he often went for his health (he had had tuberculosis). Despite this, he served in the Polish Legions during World War I.

As his health worsened, he had to give up sculpture, as it required too much effort. In addition to paintings, he created interior designs; notably at the sanatorium operated by Dr. Kazimierz Dłuski (1910). He exhibited frequently and widely until 1920.

Much of his work was destroyed during World War II.

Selected works

References

External links 

Polish illustrators
Pastel artists
Symbolist artists
1879 births
1923 deaths
Artists from Warsaw
20th-century deaths from tuberculosis
20th-century Polish painters
20th-century Polish male artists
Polish male painters
Tuberculosis deaths in Poland